"Could You Learn to Love" is a song by American contemporary R&B singer Tevin Campbell. It was written by Kenneth "Babyface" Edmonds for his third studio album Back to the World (1997). Production was helmed by Langston "Chuck Boom" Bryant and Anthony "A-Tone" Bryant under their production moniker The Boom Brothers. The song was issued as the album's third and final single in February 1997. It peaked at number 73 on the US Billboard Hot R&B/Hip-Hop Songs and reached the top forty on the New Zealand Singles Chart.

Music video

A music video for the song was directed by Vaughan Arnell.

Track listings

Notes
 denotes additional producer

Personnel and credits
Credits lifted from the liner notes of Tevin Campbell.

Tevin Campbell – lead vocals, background vocals
The Boom Brothers – producers
Babyface – writer, instruments, background vocals
Ian Boxill – recording engineer

Stephanie Gylden – assistant recording engineer
Dave "Hard Drive" Pensado – mix engineer
Matt Silva – assistant mix engineer
Zetra Smith – coordinator

Charts

References

External links
 
 

1996 songs
1997 singles
Music videos directed by Vaughan Arnell
Qwest Records singles
Songs written by Babyface (musician)
Tevin Campbell songs